Dagenham and Rainham is a constituency represented in the House of Commons of the UK Parliament by Jon Cruddas of the Labour Party since its 2010 creation.

Members of Parliament

Boundaries

Constituency profile
The constituency may retain significant pockets of poverty indicated by a high ranking in the Index of Multiple Deprivation compiled in the year 2000 however average incomes were in four large wards close to the national average. The London Borough of Barking and Dagenham saw the most rapid decrease in people of White British ethnicity in the 10 years to the 2011 census, of 31.4 percentage points.  However the same dataset shows that 58.3% of people are white in the seat, which is similar to the Greater London average.  An established area of settlement for British people of Asian ethnicity with 15.9% of this background, the neighbouring London Borough of Newham has a much higher proportion of residents with Asian heritage, 43.5%.

History
Before 1945 the Dagenham area was part of the Romford constituency. The MP for the latter seat since 1935, Labour's John Parker, continued to represent Dagenham until 1983. Parker was the last serving MP to have been elected before the Second World War, and with 48 years in Parliament, was the longest-serving Labour MP in history, a record he held until December 2017.  The seat was first contested in the 2010 general election which resulted from the Boundary Commission's report that recommended merging the majority of the former constituencies of Dagenham and Hornchurch and added to existing electoral wards a small part of River ward was also transferred from Barking.

In 2010 Labour's Jon Cruddas took the seat gaining a marginal 5.9% win, facing a strong nominal (ward-by-ward) Lab–Con swing measured against the previous forerunner seats and candidates. BNP candidate Michael Barnbrook came third with 11.2% of the vote, his party's second-best showing in the election.  In 2015, Cruddas, incumbent won an 11.6% majority; the runner-up party changed to being UKIP closely followed by the Conservative candidate.

In 2019, Cruddas' majority was cut to just 293 votes, the lowest Labour majority in Dagenham ever, which has been represented by Labour MPs since 1945.

Election results

Elections in the 2010s

* Served as MP for Dagenham in the 2005–2010 Parliament

See also
List of parliamentary constituencies in London

Notes

References

External links 
Politics Resources (Election results from 1922 onwards)
Electoral Calculus (Election results from 1955 onwards)

Politics of the London Borough of Barking and Dagenham
Politics of the London Borough of Havering
Parliamentary constituencies in London
Constituencies of the Parliament of the United Kingdom established in 2010
Dagenham